Paattali Magan is a 1990 Indian Tamil language drama film directed by Senthilnathan and produced by Kovai mani. The film stars Arjun, Sindhu and M. N. Nambiar. It was released on 16 February 1990.

Cast

Arjun as Gopi
Sindhu
M. N. Nambiar
Sathyapriya
Goundamani
Senthil
Kumarimuthu
Kamala Kamesh
Vijaychandrika
Sribala
K. K. Soundar
K. Kannan
Omakuchi Narasimhan
Usilaimani
Kanal Kannan as Henchman (special appearance)

Soundtrack

The film score and the soundtrack were composed by Sangeetha Rajan. The soundtrack, released in 1990, features 4 tracks.

References

External links

1990 films
1990s Tamil-language films
Indian drama films
Films directed by Senthilnathan